Arundinarieae is a tribe of bamboo in the grass family (Poaceae) containing a single subtribe, Arundinariinae, and 31 genera. These woody bamboos occur in areas with warm temperate climates in southeastern North America, Subsaharan Africa, South Asia and East Asia. The tribe forms a lineage independent of the tropical woody bamboos (Bambuseae) and the tropical herbaceous bamboos (Olyreae).

Genera

References

Bambusoideae
Poaceae tribes